Iceland's Bell or Iceland Clock may refer to:

Iceland's Bell (novel), a 1943 book by Nobel prize winner Halldór Kiljan Laxness
Iceland's Bell (painting), by Icelandic painter Jóhannes S. Kjarval
Iceland's Bell (sculpture), by Kristin E. Hrafnsson